Garampalli is a village in the southern state of Karnataka, India It is located in Chincholi taluk of Kalaburagi district. It belongs to karakmukli
grampanchayat.And one of the basaveshwara temple is their,And yearly one time village festival takes place .In time of April–May. And in front of the basaveshwara temple,Mullamari river is passed and reach to chincholi. And this river is came from Nagaral dam(village).

Demographics
 India census Garampalli had a population of 2189 with 1082 males and 1107 females.

Education
The school in Garampalli is government higher primary school Garampalli.

Agriculture
Major crops produced in the Garampalli area are pigeon pea, sorghum, pearl millet, chickpea, mung bean, and vigna mungo.

Transport
KSRTC bus facility is available to travel within the Karnataka state and Nabour states. The nearest railway station is (43 km) tandur railway station TDU . The nearest airport is (155 km) Rajiv Gandhi International Airport.

See also
 Gulbarga
 Districts of Karnataka

References

External links
 http://Gulbarga.nic.in

Villages in Kalaburagi district